"Need You" is the second single released by American rapper Travie McCoy from his debut solo album, Lazarus. The song was produced by Lucas Secon and written by McCoy, Secon, Wayne Hector and Carsten Mortensen aka Mintman. The song maintained a peak of number six on the Bubbling Under Hot 100 Singles Chart. The music video for "Need You" was released on October 20, 2010 and was shot in Los Angeles. The plot features McCoy wandering in Chinatown looking for his girlfriend.

Track listing
 Digital download
 "Need You" - 3:23

 Digital download - Deluxe single
 "Need You" - 3:23
 "Need You" (Alternative Radio Mix) - 3:23
 "Need You" (Music Video) - 3:26

Credits and personnel
Lead vocals – Travie McCoy
Producers – Lucas Secon
Songwriter(s) – Wayne Hector, Carsten Mortensen, Travie McCoy
Label: Fueled by Ramen

Charts

References

External links
 
 
 Travis McCoy's tumblr

2010 songs
2010 singles
Travie McCoy songs
Songs written by Wayne Hector
Songs written by Lucas Secon
Songs written by Travie McCoy
Fueled by Ramen singles